David William Sayer (born 18 October 1997) is an English cricketer. He made his first-class debut for Leicestershire in the 2018 County Championship on 10 September 2018. He is the younger brother of another Leicestershire cricketer, Rob Sayer.

References

External links
 

1997 births
Living people
English cricketers
Leicestershire cricketers
Place of birth missing (living people)
Cambridgeshire cricketers